William J. Quarter (January 21, 1806 – April 10, 1848) was an Irish American prelate of the Catholic Church. He was the first Bishop of Chicago (1844–1848).

Biography

Early years
William Quarter was born in Killurin, King's County, Ireland to Michael and Ann (née Bennet) Quarter. The third of four sons, he had three brothers: John, Walter and James; Walter and James also joined the priesthood, but the latter died before his ordination. He studied the classics at private academies in Tullamore from 1814 to 1822.

While preparing to enter Maynooth College, Quarter was visited by a priest who had served as a missionary in the United States. The young man was moved by the priest's stories of the dreadful plight of Catholics in America (many of whom were without priests, churches, or the sacraments), and resolved to dedicate himself to the missions there. Having obtained permission from Bishop James Warren Doyle, Quarter departed from Ireland in April 1822 and later landed at Quebec, Canada. Following his arrival, he was rejected at the seminaries of both the Archdiocese of Quebec and the Diocese of Montreal on account of his young age but, journeying southward, was finally accepted at Mount St. Mary's College in Emmitsburg, Maryland. While at Mount St. Mary's, he became professor of Greek and Latin, as well as sacristan, in 1823. He completed his theological studies in 1829 and then went to New York, where he was ordained a priest by Bishop John Dubois on September 19 of that year.

Quarter then served as a curate at St. Peter's Church in Manhattan, and ministered to the sick and dying during the cholera epidemic of 1832. He placed the children who had been orphaned by the epidemic under the care of the Sisters of Charity. In 1833 he was named pastor of St. Mary's Church on Grand Street on the Lower East Side, where he founded a parochial school. He also received Maximilian Oertel, a Lutheran minister, into the Catholic Church in 1840.

Episcopal ministry
On November 28, 1843, Quarter was appointed the first Bishop of the newly erected Diocese of Chicago, Illinois, by Pope Gregory XVI. He received his episcopal consecration on March 10, 1844, from Bishop John Joseph Hughes, with Bishops Benedict Joseph Fenwick, S.J., and Richard Vincent Whelan serving as co-consecrators, at St. Patrick's Cathedral. Accompanied by his brother Walter (who later became vicar general), Quarter arrived in the episcopal see of Chicago on May 5.

The Bishop completed St. Mary's Cathedral in 1845, and eliminated the diocese's $5,000 debt from his own resources and the contributions of members of his family. The founder of Catholic education in Chicago, he established University of Saint Mary of the Lake and Saint Xavier University, as well as the first parochial school. He also introduced into the diocese the Sisters of Mercy from Pittsburgh, Pennsylvania, including Mary Francis Xavier Warde. He held the first diocesan synod and was the first American bishop to establish theological conferences. It was also due principally to Quarter's efforts that the Illinois General Assembly passed in 1845 the bill according to which the Bishop of Chicago was incorporated as a "corporation sole" with power to "hold real and other property in trust for religious purposes." During his four-year-long tenure, he founded 30 churches and ordained 29 priests.

Quarter died in Chicago on April 10, 1848, at the age of 42.

See also

 Historical list of the Catholic bishops of the United States

References

1806 births
1848 deaths
19th-century Roman Catholic bishops in the United States
Irish emigrants to the United States (before 1923)
People from County Offaly
19th-century Irish people
Roman Catholic bishops of Chicago
Burials at the Bishop's Mausoleum, Mount Carmel Cemetery (Hillside)
19th-century American clergy